Hermann Vogel (16 October 1854 – 22 February 1921) was a German illustrator.

Vogel was born in Plauen, Kingdom of Saxony, as the son of a master builder. From 1874–75 he studied at the art academy of Dresden.

Vogel worked for the publishing company Braun & Schneider and was a founding member of the Deutsche
Kunstgesellschaft (German art association) and contributed to Julius Lohmeyer's journal Die deutsche Jugend and the weekly periodical Fliegende Blätter. Vogel early followed the Nazarene movement, while his later material was in the Biedermeier style.

Illustrations by Vogel appeared in an 1881 publication of Auserwählte Märchen by Hans Christian Andersen, in an 1887 publication of Volksmärchen der Deutschen by Johann Karl August Musäus, and in 1891 in Die Nibelungen by Gustav Schalk. From 1896–99 Vogel's works were collected into two volumes. Volumes 3 and 4 appeared in 1903 and 1908, respectively.  He illustrated an edition of Bluebeard in 1887, The Juniper Tree in 1893 and of Hansel and Gretel in 1894 Vogel died in Burgstein, Krebes in Saxony.

Gallery

References

1854 births
1921 deaths
People from Plauen
German illustrators
People from the Kingdom of Saxony
19th-century German painters
19th-century German male artists
German male painters
20th-century German painters
20th-century German male artists